Alexander Weir (24 February 1879–unknown) was a Scottish footballer who played in the Football League for Glossop and Stockport County.

References

1879 births
Scottish footballers
English Football League players
Association football midfielders
Stenhousemuir F.C. players
Celtic F.C. players
Reading F.C. players
Glossop North End A.F.C. players
Stockport County F.C. players
Year of death missing